Natatolana femina is a species of crustacean in the family Cirolanidae, and was first described by Stephen John Keable in 2006. The species epithet, femina, refers to the fact that no mature males were examined, only females.

It is a benthic species, found at depths of 5 - 15 m in temperate waters of the Tasmanian Shelf Province. It is a scavenger.

References

External links
Natatolana femina occurrence data from GBIF

Cymothoida
Crustaceans of Australia
Crustaceans described in 2006
Taxa named by Stephen John Keable